Partido Conservador may refer to:
 Colombian Conservative Party
 Conservative Party (Bolivia)
 Conservative Party (Brazil)
 Conservative Party (Chile)
 Conservative Party (Ecuador)
 Conservative Party of Nicaragua
 Conservative Party (Panama)
 Conservative Party (Spain)